Rhind may refer to:

 Aaron Rhind (born 1991), Australian swimmer
 Alex Rhind, Scottish footballer, played in the 1872 Scotland v England football match
 Alexander Rhind (1821–1897), American naval officer
 , US destroyer named after Alexander Rhind
 Alexander Henry Rhind (1833–1863), Scottish lawyer
 Rhind Lectures, a series of lectures on topics of archaeology originally funded by a bequeath from Alexander Henry Rhind
 Rhind Mathematical Papyrus, Egyptian papyrus named after Alexander Henry Rhind
 David Rhind (1808–1883), Scottish architect
 David William Rhind (born circa 1945), British geographer 
 Ethel Rhind, Irish artist 
 James Robert Rhind (1854–1918), Scottish architect
 John Rhind (architect) (1836–1889), Scottish architect
 John Rhind (1828–1892), Scottish sculptor, father of William Birnie Rhind and J. Massey Rhind
 John Stevenson Rhind, Scottish sculptor
 J. Massey Rhind (1860–1936), Scottish-American architectural sculptor
 Julian Rhind-Tutt (born 1967) English actor
 Neil Rhind (born 1937), English writer and historian
 Robert Rhind, Scottish footballer
 Sir Thomas Duncan Rhind (1871–1927), Scottish architect and military figure
 William Birnie Rhind (1853–1933), Scottish architectural sculptor